Ümmiye Koçak (born in 1957) is a Turkish woman, who is a theatre and movie actress, specialized on the women issues in rural areas in Turkey. Her name is mentioned in the social studies books published by the Ministry of National Education, compulsory for the 5th-grade primary school pupils.

Life
She was born in the village of Çelemli of Adana Province in 1957. She completed the primary school in her village. But she couldn't find a chance to pursue education further. After marriage in 1982, she moved to  Arslanköy, a small settlement in Mersin Province, where she still lives. She is the mother of three.

Theatre and movie career
Although insufficiently educated, she was fond of reading. In 2001, she established a women's theatre named Arslanköy Kadınlar Tiyatro Grubu ("Arslanköy Women's Theatre Group") in her small town. She staged three plays. In 2006, the group participated in the International Sabancı Theater Festival in Adana.

She then wrote a movie screenplay named Yün Bebek ("The Woolen Doll") about the life of the village women. She also directed the film, which earned her fame. In 2013, the film participated in the 2nd New York Eurasian Film Festival and was awarded. She later played in television serials. The plot reflects the tragedy of a village woman named Hatice and her daughter Elif. Hatice's second husband Ali and especially Ali's mother continually abuse Hatice and Elif. Elif, who suffers oppression, gets relief when she finds a woolen doll. Ayşe Armut, Öznur Armut and Seher Cuvadir starred in the film. There is no male character in the film except for a silhouette in one scene. The debut of the film was during the 49th International Antalya Film Festival in 2012 as a non-competing film. Later, the film was also televised in the television  channel Turkish Radio and Television Corporation (TRT).

In 2017, she participated in a television commercial of Turk Telecom with the Portuguese footballer Cristiano Ronaldo.

Select works

Screenplays
Erik Eşkisi
Ozon Tapakası
Kara Kuyu
Doktor Beleş
Turunçgil Hayattır
Çicekler Solmasın
Hasret Çiçekleri

Short stories
Vatan Sevgisi
Irazca’nın Düşleri
Kanayan Yara
Kader
Obruk
Ayaksız Ayakta Durmak
Baba Ben Geldim
Muhtar Adayı Hasret Ana.

TV serials participations
İstanbul Hanımın Çiftliği
Hayat Devam Ediyor
Hanımın Çiftliği
Kasaba
Seher Vakti.

Awards
Adana International Theatre Award
Ankara International Theatre Award
Darüşşafaka Education Initiatrive Award
Bornova International Woman Artists festival Award
Toros Koleji Education Award
Kader NGO Oppose to Violence to women Award
Mersin Industrialist and Business People Annual Art Award
TİKAV- 2012 Mother's School Award
Samsun NGO Initiative Award
New York Eurasian Film Festival Award

References

1957 births
Living people
People from Yüreğir
Turkish women film directors
Turkish women short story writers
Turkish cinematographers
Turkish theatre people